Psilotum nudum, the whisk fern, is a fernlike plant.  Like the other species in the order Psilotales, it lacks roots.

Its name, Psilotum nudum, means "bare naked" in Latin, because it lacks (or seems to lack) most of the organs of typical vascular plants, as a result of evolutionary reduction. (Note that leaves are not actually absent, but greatly reduced.)

Development
The embryo has only two parts, a distal shoot apex and a proximal foot. The shoot apex produces a rhizome without roots, possibly because P. nudum and relatives are often epiphytes. The rhizome in turn will eventually produce greatly reduced leaves instead of roots. These processes are heavily influenced by auxin concentrations.

Distribution
P. nudum is found in tropical Africa, Central America, tropical and subtropical North America, South America, tropical Asia, Australia, Hawaii, southern Japan, Lord Howe Island, New Zealand,  with a few isolated populations in SW Europe ("Los Alcornocales", Spain, Cádiz province). Although most weeds are flowering plants, P. nudum is an unusual example of a weed because it is both nonflowering and rootless.

In tropical areas, this plant is often epiphytic, whilst in more temperate areas, such as south-eastern Australia, it is usually found growing in rock crevices. Thousands of people per day walk by these plants at the Sydney Opera House forecourt.

Cultivation and uses
The plant, which grows wild in southern Japan, was once much cultivated in Japanese gardens as an ornamental plant. Slightly over 100 garden varieties were given fantastic names.  Called matsubaran ("pine-needle orchid") in Japanese, it was one of the noble plants in the Edo period (1603–1867).

The species is naturally found on all the main Hawaiian Islands. Known locally as Moa because of its chicken feet like stems, the Hawaiians collected large quantities of the spores and used them like talcum powder, under the loincloth to prevent chafing. The spores were also used medicinally as a purge. Children would play a game called 'moa nahele' or cockfighting with the branch stems. Twigs of the Moa were interlocked and the players pulled on the ends. The loser's twig broke and the winner crowed like a rooster. The species is still often used in making traditional Hawaiian leis.

Its common name, whisk fern, alludes to its use in the past as a small broom, made by tying a handful of its branches together. It is sometimes found in cultivation (either accidentally, as a weed in greenhouses, or deliberately, in the form of a number of cultivars).

It may prove to be a good source of antimicrobial chemicals.

References

External links

Psilotaceae
Ferns of Africa
Ferns of Asia
Ferns of the Americas
Ferns of Europe
Ferns of Oceania
Flora of tropical Asia
Plants described in 1753
Taxa named by Carl Linnaeus
Garden plants
Epiphytes